Morton is a masculine given name which may refer to:

 Mort Cooper (1913-1958), American Major League Baseball pitcher
 Morton DaCosta (1914–1989), American theatre and film director, film producer, writer and actor
 Morton Downey (1901-1985), American singer
 Morton Downey Jr. (1932-2001), American singer, songwriter and television talk show host, son of the above
 Morton P. Fisher (1897–1965), United States Tax Court judge
 Mort Garson (1924–2008), Canadian-born composer, arranger, songwriter and pioneer of electronic music
 Morton Gould (1913–1996), American composer, conductor, arranger and pianist
 Morton Ira Greenberg (1933–2021), United States Court of Appeals judge
 Morton Horwitz (born 1938), American legal historian and Harvard law professor
 Morton C. Hunter (1825-1896), American Union Army brevet brigadier general and politician
 Mort Kaer (1902-1992), American football player and pentathlete
 Morton Marcus (1936–2009), American poet and author
 Morton M. McCarver (1807–1875), American politician and pioneer in the West
 Morton McMichael (1807-1879), American newspaper publisher and politician
 Mort Meskin (1916-1995), American comic book artist
 Morton Peck (1871-1959), American botanist
 Mort Sahl (born 1927), Canadian-born American comedian and social satirist
 Morton O. Schapiro (born 1953), American economist and president of Northwestern University
 Mort Schell (born 1943), Australian former politician
 Morton Sobell (born 1917), American engineer and spy for the Soviet Union

See also
 Morten, a common given name in Norway and Denmark

Masculine given names